Kalipur is a census town in Suri I CD block in Suri Sadar subdivision of Birbhum district.

Geography

Location

Demographics
As per the 2011 Census of India, Kalipur had a total population of 4,770 of which 2,434 (51%) were males and 2336 (49%) were females. Population below 6 years was 534. The total number of literates in Kalipur was 3,217 (75.94% of the population over 6 years).

Infrastructure
As per the District Census Handbook 2011, Kalipur covered an area of 0.5795 km2. The nearest railway station is at Suri 4 km away. Buses are available in the town. It has 5.5 km roads and open drains. The major source of protected water supply is from bore well pumping and over head tank. There are 1,310 domestic electric connections. Amongst the medical facilities it has are 11 medicine shops. Amongst the educational facilities it has are 2 primary schools, 1 middle school, 1 secondary school and 1 senior secondary school. The nearest general degree college is at Suri. There is a public library and a reading room at Karidhya 0.5 km away. It has the branch of 1 non-agricultural credit society. Amongst the commodities it produces are handloom goods, conch shell products and sal leaf plates.

Transport
Kalipur is on State Highway 6 (locally popular as Saptagram-Tribeni-Kalna-Katwa or STKK Road).

References

Cities and towns in Birbhum district